The Mecklenburgische Staatskapelle is a symphony orchestra based in Schwerin, Germany, that was founded in 1563.

References

External links

Official website

Schwerin
German orchestras
1563 establishments in the Holy Roman Empire
Music in Mecklenburg-Western Pomerania